Brainin is a French surname. 
Notable people with the surname include:

 Boris Brainin (Sepp Österreicher, 1905-1996), Austrian poet and translator 
 Danny Brainin (?-?), film actor (Xtro, Street Smart)
 David Brainin (1905-1942), French painter and dancer, murdered in Auschwitz
 Elisabeth Brainin (1949), Austrian psychoanalyst and scientific writer, daughter of Lotte and Hugo Brainin
 Fritz (Frederick) Brainin (1913-1992), Austrian/American poet
 Grégoire Brainin (Moineau, 1933), French poet and philosopher
 Harald Brainin (1923-2006), Austrian poet and writer
 Hugo Brainin (1924), Austrian locksmith, survivor, and contemporary witness of the Holocaust, brother of Norbert Brainin, father of Elisabeth Brainin, husband of Lotte Brainin
 Jerome (Jerry) Brainin (1916-2000), American jazz and film composer, the author of a song The Night Has a Thousand Eyes (for the same film, 1948), which became a Jazz standard
 Lotte Brainin (1920), Austrian resistance fighter against National Socialism, contemporary witness, and survivor of the Holocaust, prisoner of Auschwitz and Ravensbruck, mother of Elisabeth Brainin, wife of Hugo Brainin
 Max Brainin (1909-2002), Austrian/American commercial graphic artist and violinist
 Norbert Brainin (1923–2005), Austrian/British violinist, the founder of Amadeus Quartet
 Peter Brainin (1959), American saxophonist and jazz composer
 Reuben Brainin (1862–1939), Hebrew publicist, biographer and public figure
 Simon Brainin (1854-?), Russian/American physician and public figure
 Teodor Brainin (1905-?), Russian film actor, the most known film: Benya Krik (1926)
 Valeri Brainin (1948), Russian/German musicologist, music manager and poet
 Bruce Braynen  (1912-2012), MBE - member of British Empire, Bahamian Politician, Former member of Bahamas parliament, Former V. president of senate, Builder/ developer, statesman, related (nephew) to the late Sir Alvin R. Braynen
 Sir Alvin Rudolf Braynen (1904-1992) knighted by Queen Elizabeth II, KCMG - Knight Commander of British Empire, Bahamian Politician, Former member of Bahamas parliament, Former Speaker & Deputy Speaker in Parliament, Co-Founder of Bahamas Chamber of Commerce

Other manner of writing:

 Zofia (Sofie, Sophie) Röhr-Brajnin (1861-1937), Polish/German soprano

Sources 

Russian-Jewish surnames